2-Ethyl-1-butanol (IUPAC name: 2-ethylbutan-1-ol) is an organic chemical compound. It can be used to facilitate the separation of ethanol from water, which form an azeotrope that otherwise limits the maximum ethanol concentration.

Reactions
2-Ethyl-1-butanol is manufactured industrially by the aldol condensation of acetaldehyde and butyraldehyde, followed by hydrogenation. It may also be prepared by the Guerbet reaction.

Properties and applications
The branching in 2-ethyl-1-butanol makes it harder to crystalize due to packing disruption, which results in a very low freezing point. Esters of 2-ethyl-1-butanol are similarly effected and it therefore finds application as a feedstock in the production of plasticizers and lubricants, where its presence helps reduce viscosity and lower freezing points.

See also
2-Ethylhexanol

References

Hexanols